Yaqoob Said Abdullah Abdul Baki (born 1 June 1979) is an Omani football referee who is a listed international referee for FIFA and AFC since 2010.

On 17 March 2015, he was summoned in his first official match during the 2018 FIFA World Cup qualification in Russia, in a match between Macau and Cambodia.

References 

1979 births
Living people